Edingley is a village in the Newark and Sherwood district of Nottinghamshire, England. According to the 2001 census it had a population of 390, increasing to 443 at the 2011 Census. It is located 3 miles north-west of Southwell.

The name Edingley contains the Old English personal name, Eddi,   + lēah (Old English), a forest, wood, glade, clearing; (later) a pasture, meadow.'...so 'Eddi's wood/clearing'.

The parish church of St Giles is Norman, almost completely rebuilt in 1890.
It is a largely agricultural parish with a public house, The Old Reindeer, and a residential home, Edingley Lodge (formerly Highfields).
Its allotments are historic and the plot originally held the poor house and is the same plot as in the enclosure act of 1781 and formally surveyed in 1899.

The village school was built in 1911–12 and closed in the 1960s. The private Edgehill school took over the building and extended northwards with a series of temporary buildings. This closed in 1996. The same building, known as the Old Schoolroom, is now the village community hall. A recently completed  extension has greatly improved its function and amenity, giving two function rooms, indoor W.C.s and a kitchen, which are all universally accessible.

References

External links

Villages in Nottinghamshire
Newark and Sherwood